Joseph Peirce (June 25, 1748 – September 12, 1812) was a United States representative from New Hampshire.  He was born in Portsmouth, New Hampshire. He attended school in Portsmouth and served during the American Revolutionary War in Colonel Pierse Long's regiment in 1775 and 1776.

His father was Isaac Peirce (1722–?) and mother was Mary Hardy, daughter of Captain Joseph Hardy of Salem, Massachusetts. A son Joseph Hardy Peirce (1773–1832) became active in politics, and grandson Henry A. Peirce (1808–1885) ran shipping businesses and served as  U.S. Minister to the Kingdom of Hawaii.

Peirce was a member of the New Hampshire House of Representatives in 1788, 1789, 1792–1795, 1800, and 1801. He also served as Portsmouth town clerk 1789–1794. He was elected as a Federalist to the Seventh Congress and served from March 4, 1801, until his resignation in 1802. After leaving Congress, he engaged in agricultural pursuits. He died in Alton, New Hampshire on September 12, 1812.

References

1748 births
1812 deaths
Continental Army officers from New Hampshire
Politicians from Portsmouth, New Hampshire
Federalist Party members of the United States House of Representatives from New Hampshire